The 1973 McNeese State Cowboys football team was an American football team that represented McNeese State University as a member of the Southland Conference (Southland) during the 1973 NCAA Division II football season. In their fourth year under head coach Jack Doland, the team compiled an overall record of 7–3 with a mark of 2–3 in conference play, and finished tied for fourth in the Southland.

Schedule

References

McNeese State
McNeese Cowboys football seasons
McNeese State Cowboys football